"J-Boy" is a song by French indie rock band Phoenix, issued as the lead single from their sixth studio album Ti Amo. The song peaked at No. 21 on the Billboard Alternative Songs chart in 2017.

Music video
The official music video for "J-Boy" was directed by Warren Fu. It shows the band performing the song on a spoof Italian talk show.

Charts

References

External links
 
 

2017 songs
2017 singles
Glassnote Records singles
Music videos directed by Warren Fu
Phoenix (band) songs
Song recordings produced by Thomas Mars
Songs written by Thomas Mars